This is an alphabetical list of players from Brazil who have played in Major League Baseball. The first Brazilian debuted in 2012.

Players

References
Players born in Brazil - Baseball-Reference.com.

Brazil
 
Baseball